The A61 autoroute is a French motorway forming part of the Autoroute de Deux Mers.

It connects Narbonne (and a junction on A9) and Toulouse, where it becomes the A62 towards Bordeaux.  It also has junctions with the A64 towards Bayonne and A68 towards Albi on the outskirts of Toulouse. It is totally a toll road and operated by ASF. It is with 2x2 lanes on the majority of its course except for the section between Toulouse and the junction with A66 close to Villefranche-de-Lauragais which is 2x3 lanes.  It is also the European route E80.

Junction

Exchange A61-A68-A62 Junction with A62 to Bordeaux and A68 to Albi.     
15 km 231 (La Roseraie) Towns served: Toulouse     
16 km 233 (Soupetard) Towns served: Toulouse    
17 km 235 (Lasbordes) Towns served: Toulouse, Castres via RN126.     
18 km 236 (Montaudran) Towns served: Toulouse     
19 km 239 (Le Palays-A620) Junction with A620 spur to Toulouse Centre.     
Péage de Toulouse sud     
Service Area km 248: Toulouse sud     
Rest Area km 256: Ayguesvives/Baziège     
Exchange A61-A66 Junction with the A66 to Pamiers, Andorra and Barcelona.     
20 km 264 (Villefranche de Lauragais) Towns served: Gardouch, Villefranche-de-Lauragais     
Rest Area km 265: Renneville/Villefranche     
Rest Area km 274: Port Lauragais 
21 km 288 (Castelnaudary) Towns served: Castelnaudary     
Rest Area km 292: Mireval/Castelnaudary     
22 km 302 (Bram) Towns served: Bram     
Rest Area km 303: Montréal/Bram     
Service Area km 312: Carcassonne-Arzens     
23 km 319 (Carcassonne ouest) Towns served: Carcassonne     
Rest Area km 323: Belvédère d'Auriac/Belvédère de la Cité     
24 km 329 (Carcassonne est) Towns served: Carcassonne     
Service Area km 340: Les Corbières     
Rest Area km 354: Fontcouverte/La Peyrière     
25 km 357 (Lézignan) Towns served: Lézignan-Corbières     
Rest Area km 366: Bizanet     
Rest Area km 375: Narbonne Jonquières     
Rest Area km 376: Pech Loubat     
Exchange A9-A61 Junction with the A9 to Perpignan, Narbonne and Orange.

External links

 A61 Motorway in Saratlas

A61
Narbonne